This is a list of diplomatic missions of Uruguay, excluding honorary consulates.

Current missions

Africa

Americas

Asia

Europe

Oceania

Multilateral organizations

Gallery

Closed missions

Africa

Americas

Asia

Europe

Oceania

See also 
 Foreign relations of Uruguay

Notes

References 

 
Uruguay
Diplomatic missions